Nebraska Highway 110 is a highway in northeastern Nebraska.  Its southern terminus is at Nebraska Highway 35 west of Dakota City, and its northern terminus is at U.S. Highway 20 west of South Sioux City.

Route description
Nebraska Highway 110 begins at an intersection with NE 35 west of Dakota City. N-110 terminates at an intersection with US 20.

Major intersections

References

External links

Nebraska Roads: NE 101-119

110
Transportation in Dakota County, Nebraska